Belo sur Tsiribihina Airport  is an airport serving Belo sur Tsiribihina, in the Toliara Province of Madagascar. It is located on the west coast of the island, west of the capital Antananarivo.

References

External links 
 

Airports in Madagascar
Menabe